Hocke is a surname. Notable people with the surname include:

Annika Hocke (born 2000), German pair skater
Bernard Hocke, American actor
Hans Hocke (born 1939), Austrian fencer
Stephan Hocke (born 1983), German ski jumper
Björn Höcke (born 1972), German politician